The Urfa sanjak, previously known as sanjak of Birejik, was a prefecture (sanjak) of the Ottoman Empire, located in modern-day Turkey and Syria. The city of Urfa was the Sanjak's capital.

History
In the 16th century, members of the Kurdish Reşwan is reported to have lived also in the Urfa sankak. Urfa was part of Syria according to the Treaty of Sèvres; but with the success of Turkish War of Independence, the sandals of Maraş, Antep and Urfa of the former Halep Eyalet remained in Turkey after 1921. Also, Antakya and İskenderun kazas of Halep Sanjak in one were separated as the Republic of Hatay in 1938. The republic joined to Turkey in 1939.

Subdistricts
The sanjak was made up of five districts (kazas):
 Kaza of Urfa
 Kaza of Birecik
 Kaza of Rumkale
 Kaza of Suruç
 Kaza of Harran

References

Şanlıurfa
States and territories established in 1579
Sanjaks of Ottoman Syria
1579 establishments in the Ottoman Empire
1918 disestablishments in the Ottoman Empire